Robert Mooneyhan "Robin" Tallon Jr. (born August 8, 1946) is an American businessman and politician who served five terms as a United States representative from South Carolina from 1983 to 1993. He is a member of the Democratic Party.

Early life and education 
Born in Hemingway, South Carolina, Tallon graduated from Dillon High School in 1964 and then attended University of South Carolina in 1964-1965. He received his Bachelor of Arts from American University in 1994.

Career 
Tallon was the owner of a chain of retail clothing stores in the Carolinas and Georgia and real estate broker and developer before entering politics. He was a delegate of the White House Conference on Small Business in 1980.

Congress 
Tallon was a member of the South Carolina House of Representatives from 1980 to 1982. He was elected as a Democrat to the 98th United States Congress and to the four succeeding Congresses, serving from January 3, 1983 to January 3, 1993. He was a member of the Agricultural Committee, the Merchant Marine & Fisheries Committee and was Chairman of the Tourism Caucus.

After South Carolina's 6th congressional district was redrawn by the legislature following the 1990 census and became a majority-minority district, Tallon opted not to run in 1992 for renomination as a candidate to the 103rd United States Congress.

Later career 
He is a principal in the government affairs and public relations firm, Jenkins Hill Consulting, in Washington, D.C., and serves on the board of trustees of the Medical University of South Carolina. Tallon is a member of the ReFormers Caucus of Issue One.

Personal life 
He is a resident of Florence, South Carolina and Washington, D.C.

References

External links

1946 births
Living people
Democratic Party members of the South Carolina House of Representatives
Democratic Party members of the United States House of Representatives from South Carolina
People from Hemingway, South Carolina
University of South Carolina alumni
20th-century American politicians
People from Florence, South Carolina
Members of Congress who became lobbyists